Stagecoach State Recreation Area (SRA) is a state recreation area in southeastern Nebraska, United States. The recreation area is managed by the Nebraska Game and Parks Commission.

See also
Salt Valley Lakes

References

External links
Stagecoach Lake State Recreation Area - Nebraska Game & Parks Commission

Protected areas of Lancaster County, Nebraska
State parks of Nebraska